The , , or , are the preferred weapon that the shinobi of feudal Japan carried, usually carried on the persons back, specifically horizontally at a height of around that of the person's waist.  It is portrayed by modern ninjutsu practitioners (including Masaaki Hatsumi and Stephen K. Hayes) as the weapon of the ninja, and is prominently featured in popular culture. Replicas of this sword are displayed at the Ninja Museum of Igaryu, established in the mid-1960s., at the Koka Ninja Village Museum in Kōka, Shiga, and at the Gifu Castle Archives Museum in Gifu, Gifu Prefecture, Japan 

Historically, there is no physical evidence for the existence of this "katana-like short sword legendarily used by ninja" before the 20th century, though it is believed that the designs demonstrated by alleged replicas are based on the design of wakizashi or chokutō swords or the swords associated with ashigaru.

History 
Because of the lack of any physical evidence or antique swords from the Sengoku to the Edo matching the description of the ninjatō, the history of the weapon can only be reliably chronicled from the 20th century onwards.
1956: The first known photograph of a straight-blade ninjatō was featured in a 26-page Japanese booklet entitled Ninjutsu by Heishichirō Okuse.
1964: The Ninja Museum of Igaryu in Japan, which houses replicas of the sword, is established. That same year, the swords appeared in Shinobi no Mono Kirigakure Saizō (忍びの者 霧隠才蔵) and Shinobi no Mono Zoku Kirigakure Saizō (忍びの者 続・霧隠才蔵), the 4th and 5th entries in the Japanese jidaigeki movie series Shinobi no Mono, released in theaters in Japan.
1973: Ads selling newly manufactured and imported ninja swords appear in the American magazine Black Belt.
1981: Books containing references to the sword written by Masaaki Hatsumi, the founder of the Bujinkan, and Stephen K. Hayes, an American who studied under Hatsumi in 1975, are published.
1981: The first Hollywood film to feature the ninjatō, Enter the Ninja, was released in theaters.
1983: The next Hollywood film to feature the ninjatō, Revenge of the Ninja, was released in theaters in September 1983.
1984: The first American television production to feature these swords, The Master, was broadcast on NBC from January to August 1984.

Appearance 

The ninjatō is typically depicted as being a short sword, often portrayed as having a straight blade (similar to that of a shikomizue) with a square guard. Usually of a length "less than 60 cm", the rest of the sword is comparatively "thick, heavy and straight". Despite the disputed historical existence of the ninjato, Hayes claims to describe it in detail, and suggests that the typical description of the ninjatō could be due to ninja having to forge their own blades from slabs of steel or iron with the cutting edge being ground on a stone, with straight blades being easier to form than the much more refined curved traditional Japanese sword. His second possible reason for ninjatō being described as a straight-bladed, rather short sword could be that the ninja were emulating one of the patron Buddhist deities of ninja families, Fudo Myo-oh, who is depicted brandishing a straight-bladed short sword similar to a chokutō.

Usage 
Due to the lack of historical evidence regarding the existence of the ninjatō, techniques for usage in a martial context are largely speculative. When used in film and stage, ninjatō are depicted as being shorter than a katana with a straight blade but they are utilized in a "nearly identical" manner as the katana. Books and other written materials have described a number of possible ways to use the sword including "fast draw techniques centered around drawing the sword and cutting as a simultaneous defensive or attacking action", with "a thrust fencing technique", and with a "reverse grip".

The scabbards were often said to have been used for various purposes such as a respiration pipe (snorkel) in underwater activities or for secretly overhearing conversations. The scabbard is also said to have been longer than the blade of the ninjatō in order to hide various objects such as chemicals used to blind pursuers. The tsuba (hand guard) of the ninjato is often described as being larger than average and square instead of the much more common round tsuba. One theory on the ninjatō tsuba size and shape is that it was used as a tool, the sword would be leaned against a wall and ninja would use the tsuba as a step to extend his normal reach, the sword would then be retrieved by pulling it up by the sageo (saya cord).

Literature
Jürgen Bieber: Ninja-to: The sword of the ninja, Verlag Autorenschmie.de, Wangen 2009, ISBN 978-3-940404-12-1
A Glossary of Arms and Armor, ed. George C. Stone, Southworth Press, 1961, p. 469
Secret Guide to Making Ninja Weapons, by Yamashiro Toshitora, Butokukai Press, 1986, ISBN 978-99942-913-1-1

References

External links 

Nihonto message board forum
Ninjatō at the Koka Ninja Village Museum

Japanese sword types
Ninjutsu artefacts